is a passenger railway station located in the city of Sakado, Saitama, Japan, operated by the private railway operator Tōbu Railway.

Lines
During the daytime, the station is served by four trains per hour in each direction.

Station layout
The station consists of a single side platform serving one bi-directional track.

A universal access toilet was added during fiscal 2012.

Adjacent stations

History

The station opened on 28 February 1936.

A junction, "Nishi-Ōya Junction", was built to the east of the station in 1963 for a spur serving the Nippon Cement factory nearby, but this line closed in 1984.

Platform edge sensors and TV monitors were installed in 2008 ahead of the start of driver-only operation on the Ogose Line from June 2008. From 17 March 2012, station numbering was introduced on the Tobu Ogose Line, with Nishi-Ōya Station becoming "TJ-42".

Passenger statistics
In fiscal 2019, the station was used by an average of 3,981 passengers daily.

Surrounding area
Nishi-Ōya Station lies close to the boundary between Sakado and Tsurugashima cities.

 Tokyo International University Sakado campus
 Saitama Prefectural Sakado Nishi High School

Bus services
Nishi-Ōya Station is served by the "Sakacchi Bus" (Ōya Line) community bus service operated by the city of Sakado.

See also
 List of railway stations in Japan

References

External links

  

Stations of Tobu Railway
Tobu Ogose Line
Railway stations in Saitama Prefecture
Railway stations in Japan opened in 1936
Sakado, Saitama